Modarelli is a surname. Notable people with the surname include:

Alfred Egidio Modarelli (1898–1957), American judge
Antonio Modarelli (1894–1954), American conductor and composer
Giuliano Modarelli (born 1977), Italian guitarist, composer, and producer